Lucia Osborne-Crowley is a British–Australian writer, living in London. She has written two books about how trauma affects the body.

Early life and education
Osborne-Crowley was born in London and raised in Brisbane and Sydney, Australia. She was a junior gymnastics champion. She graduated with a degree in international studies from the University of Sydney in 2013 and with a Juris Doctor degree from the University of New South Wales in 2018.

Career
I Choose Elena (2020) is a short memoir "in which she recounts her experience of suffering a violent rape as a teenager, leading to years of chronic illness, anxiety and an eating disorder." In My Body Keeps Your Secrets (2021) "as well as telling her own story, she draws from more than 100 interviews to explore how women and non-binary people are defined by and fighting for their bodies. [. . .] a hybrid of academic prose, memoir and reportage".

Osborne-Crowley works as a journalist, legal affairs correspondent, and writer.

Publications
I Choose Elena: On Trauma, Memory and Survival. Mood Indigo Book 2. London: Indigo, 2020. .
My Body Keeps Your Secrets: Dispatches on Shame and Reclamation. London: Indigo, 2021. .

See also
The Body Keeps the Score by Bessel van der Kolk

References

External links

21st-century Australian non-fiction writers
21st-century Australian women writers
21st-century Australian journalists
Australian women journalists
British women journalists
21st-century English non-fiction writers
21st-century English women writers
English memoirists
Women memoirists
University of New South Wales alumni
University of Sydney alumni
People from London
Living people
Year of birth missing (living people)